The Diocese of Saskatchewan is a diocese of the Ecclesiastical Province of Rupert's Land of the Anglican Church of Canada formed in 1874. Its headquarters are in Prince Albert, Saskatchewan.  The Diocese of Saskatoon was split off from it in 1933.

The diocese encompasses the northern two-thirds of Saskatchewan and has 35 parishes and 68 congregations. About 23,000 people are identified as Anglican though attendance is much less.  There are 28 active and 15 retired clergy and 110 lay readers. Half of the active clergy are non-stipendiary.

Bishops 
1874 John McLean
1887 Cyprian Pinkham (1st Bishop of Calgary, 1903)
1903 Jervois Newnham
1922 George Lloyd
1931 William Hallam (became Bishop of Saskatoon when the diocese was split)
1933 Walter Burd
1939 Henry Martin
1960 Bill Crump
1970 Vicars Short
1985 Tom Morgan (afterwards Bishop of Saskatoon, 1993)
1993 Tony Burton
2009 Michael Hawkins

Suffragan Bishops 
1989 - 2008 Charles Arthurson

Deans of Saskatchewan
The Dean of Saskatchewan is also Rector of St Alban's Cathedral.

?–1963: R. Leslie Taylor 
1963–1970: Vicars Short  (Bishop of Saskatchewan, 1970) 
1971–?: John H. McMulkin 
1984–1990: Bruce Stavert (afterwards Bishop of Quebec, 1991) 
1991–1993: Tony Burton  (Bishop of Saskatchewan, 1993)
1994–2001: Stephen Andrews (later Bishop of Algoma, 2008)
2001–2009: Michael Hawkins (Bishop of Saskatchewan, 2009)
2010–present: Kenneth Davis

References

External links 
 
 

Religious organizations established in 1874
Saskatchewan, Anglican Diocese of
Anglican dioceses established in the 19th century
 
Christianity in Saskatchewan
Prince Albert, Saskatchewan
1874 establishments in Canada
Anglican Province of Rupert's Land